Club Deportivo Fuentes is a Spanish football team based in Fuentes de Ebro, in the autonomous community of Aragon. Founded in 1967, the club plays in the Regional Preferente de Aragón – Group 3, and holds home games at Campo de Fútbol San Miguel, with a capacity of 1,000 people.

Season to season

7 seasons in Tercera División

References

External links
Soccerway team profile

Football clubs in Aragon
Association football clubs established in 1967
1967 establishments in Spain